Gaston Braun (born 1 September 1903, date of death unknown) was a Belgian bobsledder who competed in the 1930s. He finished eighth in the four-man event at the 1936 Winter Olympics in Garmisch-Partenkirchen.

References
1936 bobsleigh four-man results
1936 Olympic Winter Games official report. - p. 415.

Belgian male bobsledders
Bobsledders at the 1936 Winter Olympics
1903 births
Year of death missing
Olympic bobsledders of Belgium